William Fitzgerald may refer to:

William FitzGerald (bishop) (1814–1883), Anglican bishop, first of Cork, Cloyne and Ross and then of Killaloe and Clonfert
William Fitzgerald (Bishop of Clonfert and Kilmacduagh) (died 1722), Anglican bishop in Ireland
William FitzGerald (Irish judge) (1906–1974), Irish lawyer and judge
William Fitzgerald (Tennessee politician) (1799–1864), United States Representative from Tennessee
William FitzGerald, 2nd Duke of Leinster (1749–1804), Irish liberal politician and landowner
William FitzGerald, 13th Earl of Kildare (died 1599), Irish nobleman
William FitzGerald-de Ros, 22nd Baron de Ros (1797–1874), British Lord and general
William Fitzgerald, Niagara Falls daredevil who used the alias Nathan Boya
William Charles Fitzgerald (1938–1967), United States Navy officer who was killed in action during the Vietnam War
William F. Fitzgerald (1846–1903), California Attorney General and a California Supreme Court justice
William H. G. FitzGerald (1909–2006), U.S. Ambassador to Ireland, 1992–1993
William Henry Fitzgerald (1849–1922), Wisconsin State Assemblyman
William J. Fitzgerald (1887–1947), U.S. Representative from Connecticut
William James Fitzgerald (jurist) (1894–1989), Irish jurist; Chief Justice of the Supreme Court of Palestine during the time of the British Mandate
William James Fitzgerald (Kansas politician) (1861–1937), Lieutenant Governor of Kansas

William Patrick Fitzgerald (1864–1938), Australian politician
William S. Fitzgerald (1880–1937), American politician
William Fitzgerald (educationalist) (1838–1920), New Zealand teacher and educationalist
William T. Fitzgerald (1858–1939), U.S. Representative from Ohio
William Thomas Fitzgerald (1759–1829), British poet
William Vincent Fitzgerald (1867–1929), Australian botanist
William B. Fitzgerald (1914–1970), Michigan politician
William B. Fitzgerald Jr. (1942–2008), American politician in Michigan
Bill Fitzgerald, news anchor

See also
William Vesey-Fitzgerald (disambiguation)